The 2008 British Columbia Scotties Tournament of Hearts, British Columbia's women's provincial curling championship, was held January 23-27 at the Trail Curling Club in Trail, British Columbia. The winning team of Allison MacInnes represented British Columbia at the 2008 Scotties Tournament of Hearts in Regina, Saskatchewan, finishing round robin with a 4-7 record.

Teams

Standings

Results

Draw 1
January 23, 12:30 PM PT

Draw 2
January 23, 7:30 PM PT

Draw 3
January 24, 12:30 PM PT

Draw 4
January 24, 7:30 PM PT

Draw 5
January 25, 12:30 PM PT

Draw 6
January 25, 7:30 PM PT

Draw 7
January 26, 9:30 AM PT

Playoffs

Semifinal
January 26, 7:30 PM PT

Final
January 27, 2:30 PM PT

References

British Columbia Scotties Tournament Of Hearts, 2008
2008 in British Columbia